The Grand Hotel, at 306 W. Coal Ave. in Gallup, New Mexico, was built in 1925.  It was listed on the National Register of Historic Places in 1988.

It is a two-story "Decorative Brick Commercial" building.

It competed with the Harvey Hotel one block to the west.

The hotel went out of business around 1980, and it has also operated as "Ricca's Mercantile", a store.

References

Hotels in New Mexico
National Register of Historic Places in McKinley County, New Mexico
Buildings and structures completed in 1925